XHCC-FM is a radio station on 89.3 FM in Colima, Colima. The station is owned by Grupo Imagen and carries its talk format.

History
XHCC began with a concession issued in 1993 to Gonzalo Castellot Madrazo. XHCC was known as Volcán FM. After 15 years, XHCC was sold to Grupo Imagen.

References

Radio stations in Colima
Grupo Imagen